Ellen Pau is an artist, curator and researcher based in Hong Kong. She is also co-founder of Videotage and founding artistic director of the Microwave International New Media Arts Festival. The artist's first retrospective exhibition in Hong Kong was organized by Para Site in 2018. The exhibition included major video installations ranging from the 1980s to the present.

Early life
Pau graduated from Diagnostic Radiography in 1985 at Hong Kong Polytechnic University and has worked as a professional radiographer and mammographer in Queen Mary Hospital. During her undergraduate study, she worked as a stage actor, music editor, and concert organizer while at Polytechnic. She also joined experimental theatre company Zuni Icosahedron where she became more familiar with contemporary art. A mostly self-taught artist, she gained a master's degree in Visual Culture at Chinese University of Hong Kong in 2008.

Pau's interest in art and technology perhaps could be traced back to her visit to the Expo '70 when she was eight-year-old. The Expo '70 has been massively promoted in Asia, including Hong Kong. With her family, Pau had spent a few days at the Expo and went through most of the pavilions. One of them with people doing weird things and with a lot of screens leaves a great impression on her. She later found out that what she saw was the Pepsi-Cola Pavilion Project (1968-1972) by renowned American experimental group, Experiments in Art and Technology (E.A.T.).

Work 
Inspired by 1960s filmmakers and artists such as Jean-Luc Godard and Martha Rosler, Pau created her first super-8 film Glove in 1984. In the early 1990s, Pau began to create video installations, such as Alice Doesn’t Live Here Anymore in collaboration with Chan Pik Yu and Jesse Dai and Recycling Cinema (1998), a video that captures blurred images of moving vehicles on a Hong Kong highway, was exhibited at the Hong Kong Pavilion in the 49th Venice Biennale in 2001, and in Art and China after 1989: Theater of the World at the Guggenheim Museum (2017).

Pau is active as a curator and organizer in the art world. A vocal supporter of the independent arts scene, she has advocated for increasing funding and exhibition opportunities for artists in non-traditional. In 1986, together with Wong Chi-fai, May Fung, and Comyn Mo, she founded Videotage, Hong Kong's oldest video and media art space. In 1996, she founded Microwave International New Media Arts Festival, an annual event that includes exhibitions, conferences, seminars, school tours and workshops. Pau has also independently curated exhibitions including Digit@logue (2008) at the Hong Kong Museum of Art. From 2013 to 2019, Pau was appointed by the Hong Kong Arts Development Council (HKADC) as a representative of the arts sector in Film Arts. Later in 2014, she was further appointed to the interim acquisition committee of M+ in West Kowloon Cultural District to advise on collection development.

Works by Pau can be found in these collections: VMAC, Videotage and Video Bureau.

Videography

Publications
 Elaine W. NG(伍穎瑜): dye-a-di-a-logue with Ellen Pau. Monographs in Contemporary Art Books. 2004. .
 SING Song-yong(孫松榮), 'Delayed Plasticity: A Preliminary Investigation of the Political Criticism of Sinophone Single-Channel Video Art in the 1980s,' Journal of Taipei Fine Arts Museum, 34 (Nov 2017), 65–90. (in Chinese)
 Linda Lai (2015), 'Video Art in Hong Kong: Organologic Sketches for a Dispersive History', in Hong Kong Visual Arts Yearbook 2014, Hong Kong: Department of Fine Arts, The Chinese University of Hong Kong, 15–54.
 Alice Jim, ‘Screen Structures: Overview of Media Art Development in Hong Kong.’ Hong Kong Visual Arts Yearbook 2003 (1), Hong Kong: Department of Fine Arts, The Chinese University of Hong Kong, 2004, 150–58.
 Ellen Pau, "Development of Hong Kong Video Art." VTEXT, June 1997, p. 54 -57.

References

1961 births
Hong Kong people
Hong Kong artists
Hong Kong women artists
Living people